The Juno Awards of 2008 were held in Calgary, Alberta, Canada on the weekend ending 6 April 2008. These ceremonies honoured music industry achievements in Canada in the latter part of 2006 and in most of 2007.

Country performer and multiple Juno Award winner Paul Brandt received the 2008 Humanitarian Award which is now named after CHUM-FM Radio founder, Allan Waters. Moses Znaimer, who led the development of Citytv and MuchMusic, received the Walt Grealis Special Achievement Award. Nominations for all remaining categories were announced on 5 February 2008.

Notable among winners was Feist, winning all five awards in her nominated categories, three of which were presented in the televised gala.

Presentations

Saturday gala
The Saturday gala where most awards are presented occurred at the Telus Convention Centre on 5 April, while the major awards were presented at the Pengrowth Saddledome on Sunday (6 April).

Sunday televised ceremonies
Performers appearing on the program included Feist, Finger Eleven, Michael Bublé, Avril Lavigne, Anne Murray, Paul Brandt, Aaron Lines, Gord Bamford, Hedley, Johnny Reid, and Jully Black.

The televised event was broadcast on CTV and hosted by Russell Peters. Peters' monologue was described by Edmonton Sun columnist Bill Harris as "the funniest opening five minutes we've ever seen from an awards-show host." Peters was also cited by Toronto Star entertainment critic Ben Rayner as offering a break from recent years of "iffy emceeing" during the award broadcasts.

The 2008 broadcast attracted CTV's second-highest ratings since the network gained broadcast rights. 1.45 million viewers were measured in 2008 compared to 2.18 million for the 2003 ceremonies.

Jeff Healey, an internationally noted Canadian musician who died the month before the Juno ceremonies, was given a brief tribute mention by members of Blue Rodeo during the televised awards ceremony.

Nominees and winners

Nominees for the 2008 Juno Awards were announced on 5 February 2008. On 15 February 2008, CARAS indicated that it made a "logistical error" during its nominations voting process, announcing the addition of two new nominations and the replacement of one nomination as follows:

 Album of the Year: Anne Murray Duets: Friends & Legends, Anne Murray
 New Artist of the Year: Jill Barber
 Rap Recording of the Year: Memoirs of a Playbwoy, JDiggz; "Fall From Paradise" by Classified was disqualified because the song appeared on the album Hitch Hikin' Music which was previously nominated for the 2007 awards.

Artist of the Year 
Winner: Feist

Other nominees:
Michael Bublé
Celine Dion
Avril Lavigne
Pascale Picard

Group of the Year 
Winner: Blue Rodeo

Other nominees:
Arcade Fire
Finger Eleven
Hedley
Kaïn

New Artist of the Year 
Winner: Serena Ryder

Other nominees:
Jill Barber (nomination added on 15 February 2008)
Belly
Jeremy Fisher
Justin Nozuka
Suzie McNeil

New Group of the Year 
Winner: Wintersleep

Other nominees:
Dragonette
Faber Drive
illScarlett
State of Shock

Jack Richardson Producer of the Year
Winner: Joni Mitchell, "Hana" and "Bad Dreams"

Other nominees:
Kevin Churko, "I Don't Wanna Stop" and "God Bless the Almighty Dollar" (Ozzy Osbourne)
Rhys Fulber, "Weak in the Knees" and "Just Another Day" (Serena Ryder)
Bob Rock, "Everything" (Michael Bublé) and "Bomb" (Payola$)
Skratch Bastid, "Way Back When" and "The Outskirts" (Buck 65)

Recording Engineer of the Year
Winner: Kevin Churko, Black Rain (Ozzy Osbourne)

Other nominees:
John Bailey, Make Someone Happy (Sophie Milman)
Richard Chycki, Snakes & Arrows (Rush) and Are You Listening? (Dolores O'Riordan)
George Seara, Holly Cole (Holly Cole)
Jeff Wolpert, Onward! (Manteca)

Songwriter of the Year
Winner: Feist, "My Moon My Man", "1234", "I Feel It All"

Other nominees:
Daniel Bélanger, "La Fin de l'homme", "Television", "Sports et loisirs"
Avril Lavigne, "Girlfriend", "Keep Holding On", "When You're Gone"
Joel Plaskett, "Fashionable People", "Nothing More to Say", "Face of the Earth"
Rufus Wainwright, "Going to a Town", "Release the Stars", "Do I Disappoint You"

Fan Choice Award 
Winner: Michael Bublé

Other nominees:
Celine Dion
Claude Dubois
Nelly Furtado
Avril Lavigne

Nominated albums

Album of the Year 
Winner: The Reminder, Feist

Other nominees:
The Best Damn Thing, Avril Lavigne
Call Me Irresponsible, Michael Bublé
Anne Murray Duets: Friends & Legends, Anne Murray (nomination added on 15 February 2008)
D'elles, Celine Dion
Taking Chances, Celine Dion

Aboriginal Recording of the Year 
Winner: The Dirty Looks, Derek Miller

Other nominees:
Home and Native Land, Little Hawk
Nikawiy Askiy, Sandy Scofield
Phoenix], Fara Palmer
What It Takes, Donny Parenteau

Adult Alternative Album of the Year 
Winner: Small Miracles, Blue Rodeo

Other nominees:
Chrome Dreams II, Neil Young
Goodbye Blue Monday, Jeremy Fisher
No Stranger, Tom Cochrane
Release the Stars, Rufus Wainwright

Alternative Album of the Year 
Winner: Neon Bible, Arcade Fire

Other nominees:
Close to Paradise, Patrick Watson
The Con, Tegan and Sara
LP, Holy Fuck
Welcome to the Night Sky, Wintersleep

Blues Album of the Year 
Winner: Building Full of Blues, Fathead

Other nominees:
Blues Thing, Jack de Keyzer
High Country Blues, Harrison Kennedy
Junction City, Little Miss Higgins
A Lesson I've Learned, The Johnny Max Band

CD/DVD Artwork Design of the Year 
Winner: Tracy Maurice and François Miron, Neon Bible (Arcade Fire)

Other nominees:
Felix Wittholz, Situation (album) (Buck 65)
Jeff Harrison and Clinton Hussey, Ornamental Eterworld (Vonnegut Dollhouse)
John Cook, Mark Burchner and Greg Bennet, Revue: The Best of Paul Reddick
Mathieu Houde, Simon Rivest, Catherine Lepage, Mathieu Doyon, 2×2 (Pierre LaPointe)

Children's Album of the Year 
Winner: Music Soup, Jen Gould

Other nominees:
Gonna Keep Dancing, Eddie Douglas
This is Daniel Cook: Here We Are, This is Daniel Cook
Prokofiev: Peter and the Wolf, Windsor Symphony Orchestra
Superstars, The Doodlebops

Contemporary Christian/Gospel Album of the Year 
Winner:  Holy God, Brian Doerksen

Other nominees:
 Beautiful, Amanda Falk
 Five Score and Seven Years Ago, Relient K
 Roots Revolution, Newworldson
 The Flame in All of Us, Thousand Foot Krutch

Classical Album of the Year (large ensemble) 
Winner: Korngold, Barber & Walton Violin Concertos, James Ehnes, Bramwell Tovey, Vancouver Symphony Orchestra

Other nominees:
 Elgar Violin Concertos, James Ehnes, Andrew Davis, Philharmonia Orchestra
 La Mer Yannick Nézet-Séguin, Orchestre Métropolitain du Grand Montréal
 Vivaldi: L’estro armonico, Tafelmusik Baroque Orchestra
 Water Music, Les Violons du Roy

Classical Album of the Year (solo or chamber ensemble) 
Winner: Alkan Concerto for Solo Piano, Marc-André Hamelin

Other nominees:
 After Reading Shakespeare, Matt Haimovitz
 Bach Cello Suites, Jean-Guihen Queyras
 Rameau Keyboard Suites, Angela Hewitt
 Shostakovich: Complete Works for Piano Trio/Silvestrov: Postlude DSCH, The Gryphon Trio

Classical Album of the Year (vocal or choral performance) 
Winner:  Surprise, Measha Brueggergosman

Other nominees:
 Buxtehude – Membra Jesu Nostri, Les Voix Baroques
 Constantinople, The Gryphon Trio
 Samuel Barber Songs, Gerald Finley
 Schubert Among Friends, The Aldeburgh Connection

Francophone Album of the Year 
Winner:  L'Échec du matériel, Daniel Bélanger

Other nominees:
 D'elles, Céline Dion
 L'homme qui me ressemble, Damien Robitaille
 De retour à la source, Isabelle Boulay
 Vers à soi, Jorane

Instrumental Album of the Year 
Winner:  The Utmost, Jayme Stone

Other nominees:
 Foley Room, Amon Tobin
 Jalopy, Joey Wright
 Kensington Suite, Richard Underhill
 Snake Road, Bob Lanois

International Album of the Year 
Winner: Good Girl Gone Bad, Rihanna

Other nominees:
The Dutchess, Fergie
Lost Highway, Bon Jovi
Noël, Josh Groban
Timbaland Presents Shock Value, Timbaland

Contemporary Jazz Album of the Year 
Winner:  Almost Certainly Dreaming, The Chris Tarry Group

Other nominees:
 Chasing After Light, Michael Occhipinti and Creation Dream
 Forty Revolutions, David Occhipinti
 Metaphora, Altered Laws
 Onward!, Manteca

Traditional Jazz Album of the Year 
Winner:  Debut, Brandi Disterheft

Other nominees:
 Brubeck Braid: twotet/deuxtet, David Braid, Matt Brubeck
 Code Breaking, Tara Davidson
 Foundations, Jodi Proznick Quartet
 Live Jazz Legends, Oliver Jones, PJ Perry, Ian MacDougall, Terry Clarke, Michel Donato

Vocal Jazz Album of the Year 
Winner: Make Someone Happy, Sophie Milman

Other nominees:
The Very Thought of You, Emilie-Claire Barlow
Destination Moon, Deborah Cox
Holly Cole, Holly Cole
Days Like These, Michael Kaeshammer

Pop Album of the Year 
Winner: The Reminder, Feist

Other nominees:
 Call Me Irresponsible, Michael Bublé
 Anne Murray Duets: Friends & Legends, Anne Murray
 Street Gospels, Bedouin Soundclash
 Taking Chances, Celine Dion

Rock Album of the Year 
Winner: Them vs. You vs. Me, Finger Eleven

Other nominees:
 Hospital Music, Matthew Good
 The Lucky Ones, Pride Tiger
 The Saint Alvia Cartel, The Saint Alvia Cartel
 Underclass Hero, Sum 41

Roots and Traditional Album of the Year (Solo) 
Winner: Right Of Passage, David Francey

Other nominees:
 The Devil on a Bench in Stanley Park, Justin Rutledge
 For All Time, Jill Barber
 Horse Soldier! Horse Soldier!, Corb Lund
 Short Stories, Oh Susanna

Roots and Traditional Album of the Year (Group) 
Winner:  Key Principles, Nathan

Other nominees:
 ¿Buddy, Where You Been?, Compadres: James Keelaghan and Oscar Lopez
 Mystic Bridge, Ellen McIlwaine with Cassius Khan
 In Good We Trust, Harry Manx and Kevin Breit
 New Seasons, The Sadies
 Stellar Jays, John Reischman and The Jaybirds

World Music Album of the Year 
Winner:  Agua Del Pozo, Alex Cuba

Other nominees:
 Frontiers, Jesse Cook
 Jogo da Vida, Celso Machado
 So the Journey Goes, Autorickshaw
 Wanderlust, Kiran Ahluwalia

Nominated releases

Single of the Year 
Winner:  "1234", Feist

Other nominees:
 "Everything", Michael Bublé
 "Girlfriend", Avril Lavigne
 "Paralyzer", Finger Eleven
 "Seven Day Fool", Jully Black

Classical Composition of the Year 
Winner: "Constantinople", Christos Hatzis

Other nominees:
 "A Child’s Cry From Izieu", Oskar Morawetz
 "Letters From Mignon", R. Murray Schafer
 "Quantum Mechanics", Jeffrey Ryan
 "This Isn’t Silence", Brian Current

Country Recording of the Year 
Winner:  Risk, Paul Brandt

Other nominees:
 Honkytonks and Heartaches, Gord Bamford
 Kicking Stones, Johnny Reid
 Life Is Calling My Name, Shane Yellowbird
 Moments That Matter, Aaron Lines

Dance Recording of the Year 
Winner:  All U Ever Want, Billy Newton-Davis vs. Deadmau5

Other nominees:
 After Hours, Melleefresh vs. Deadmau5
 Every Time You Move, Nick Fiorucci
 Fancy Footwork, Chromeo
 Poppin’ Beats, Hatiras

Music DVD of the Year 
Winner:  666 Live, Billy Talent

Other nominees:
 Danny Michel and The Black Tornados, Danny Michel
 One Night at the Metropolis, Jesse Cook
 Nights from the Alhambra, Loreena McKennitt
 Trinity Revisited, Cowboy Junkies

R&B/Soul Recording of the Year 
Winner:  Revival, Jully Black

Other nominees:
 The Birth of Cornelius, Corneille
 Goldrush, Ebrahim
 2U, Keshia Chanté
 We Can All Be Free, God Made Me Funky

Rap Recording of the Year 
Winner: The Revolution, Belly

Other nominees:
 The Fewturistic, BrassMunk
 Memoirs of a Playbwoy, JDiggz
 Port Authority, Marco Polo
 The Old Prince, Shad

Reggae Recording of the Year 
Winner:  "Don't Go Pretending", Mikey Dangerous

Other nominees:
 "Don't Go", Korexion
 "Final Road", Blessed
 "Music is my Life", Tanya Mullings
 "Two Chord Skankin'", Lyndon John X

Video of the Year 
Winner:  Christopher Mills, "C’mon" (Blue Rodeo)

Other nominees:
 Kyle Davison, "Shake Tramp" (Marianas Trench)
 Vincent Morriset, "Neon Bible" (Arcade Fire)
 Marc Ricciardelli, "Walls Fall Down" (Bedouin Soundclash)
 Sean Wainsteim, "Cheer It On" (Tokyo Police Club)

Compilation CD
A compilation album was released in February 2008

1.My Moon My Man - Feist—2.For The Nights I Can't Remember - Hedley—3.Girlfriend (radio edit) - Avril Lavigne—4.Nothing Special - IllScarlett—5.I Get Around - Dragonette—6.Paralyzer (clean version) - Finger Eleven—7.Tongue Tied - Faber Drive—8.Gate 22 - Pascale Picard—9.Everything - Michael Bublé—10. After Tonight - Justin Nozuka—11. Weak In The Knees - Serena Ryder—12.Born Losers - Matthew Good—13. Weighty Ghost - Wintersleep—14. This Town - Blue Rodeo—15.Walls Fall Down - Bedouin Soundclash—16.Pressure (radio edit) - Belly feat. Ginuwine—17.Seven Day Fool - Jully Black—18.Day Dream Believer - Anne Murray & Nelly Furtado—19.Didn't Even See The Dust - Paul Brandt—20.Dirty Old Man - Neil Young—21.Le Bonheur Au Large - Kaïn

References

External links
 Juno Awards official site
 Juno Awards 2008 Nominees and Winners

2008
2008 in Canadian music
2008 music awards
2008 in Alberta
April 2008 events in Canada
Events in Calgary